Thomas Asher (21 December 1936 – 11 March 2017) was an English footballer who played in the Football League for Notts County. He also played for Peterborough United, Illkeston Town, Ransome & Marles, Grantham Town, Eastwood Town and Keyworth United. During his youth, Tommy represented England Schoolboys and played alongside Manchester United's Duncan Edwards.

Early life 
Asher was born on the 21st of December 1936 and was raised in Dunscroft in Yorkshire.

Youth career

Doncaster Schoolboys 
As a young boy, Asher rose to prominence thanks to his performances with Doncaster Schoolboys. After impressing the England coaches with his ability, he was called up to play for his country at Schoolboy level. He went on to play three times at this level.

Wolverhampton Wanderers 
When Asher was in his mid-teens, he was approached by top clubs. He was contemplating between Manchester United and Wolverhampton Wanderers. At this time, Sir Matt Busby visited Asher's home in Dunscroft in an attempt to influence his choice. At the time, Wolves were the more successful team. This managed to turned Asher's head. He signed for the club's youth team. He was a key figure in the 1954 team that reached the final of the FA Youth Cup against Manchester United. However, he could not play due to an injury. He scored twice in the cup run, against Derby County and Spalding United. He was instrumental in helping the Wolves youth team win the Birmingham and District League title in the same season.

Club career

Notts County 
In 1954, Asher joined Notts County and played there for 5 years. In that time, he made 31 first-team appearances and scored 4 goals. To build up his confidence and ability, the club's coaches urged Asher to play in the team's reserve team before his debut. He spent three seasons with the reserves, before making his senior debut in a home game against Swansea Town (as they were then) in September 1957. Notts were beaten 4–2, but gained revenge in the return fixture a week later, winning 3-1, with Tommy scoring the first of his four goals for the Magpies. He continued to be a squad player for until 1959 when he left the magpies to join Peterborough United.

Peterborough United 
Asher then dropped out of League football and moved to non League club Peterborough United, in 1959. At the time, they competed in the Midland League. Due to the sheer brilliance of rival inside forward Dennis Emery, Asher struggled to forge a first team position so competed frequently for the reserves. He was described as "a clever little player who certainly knew how to score" and he showed that during his one and only season for the Posh as he scored 30 goals. He was a prolific goal scorer for the reserves and even scored 4 goals in one match against Harwich & Parkeston on 10 October 1959 in the Eastern Counties League.

He made two first-team appearances for the Posh, the first a 2–1 loss against Ashington. Asher kept his place for the next Posh game, away at Spennymoor Town, which Posh won 3–1, but it proved to be his final first-team game for the club as he left at the end of the season to join Illkeston Town.

Illkeston Town 
After spending just one season at the Posh, he returned to Nottinghamshire to join Ilkeston Town in the Central Alliance League in 1960. He joined up with the squad just before the start of the 1960/61 season and scored the winning goal on his debut in an away win against Nottingham Forest. His footballing artistry was seen at first hand but not frequently enough which resulted in his release in 1961. His final appearance was against Sutton Town on 14 October 1961. Asher went on to appear for Ransome & Marles, Grantham Town and Eastwood Town before playing for his final full-time club, Keyworth United in 1966.

Personal life 
In 1957, aged 21, he married Glennis May Asher. They had three children together: Neil, Tracey and Sally. Their children are Tom, Poppy, Milly, Charlotte, Alex, Jack and Katie. Towards the end of his life, he became a great-grandad to Kieran and Evie-May.

Death 
Tommy Asher died at the age of 80 on 11 March 2017 in his home in Gotham, Nottinghamshire.

References

1936 births
2017 deaths
Association football forwards
English footballers
Ilkeston Town F.C. (1945) players
Midland Football League players
Notts County F.C. players
Peterborough United F.C. players
English Football League players